Asiarcha oblonga is a species of Tesseratomid bug found in South Asia. The species was originally described as Mattiphus oblongus.

References

Tessaratomidae
Insects described in 1851